= Moscoso Park =

Conservation area in Brazil

Coordinates: 20°19′09″S 40°20′31″W

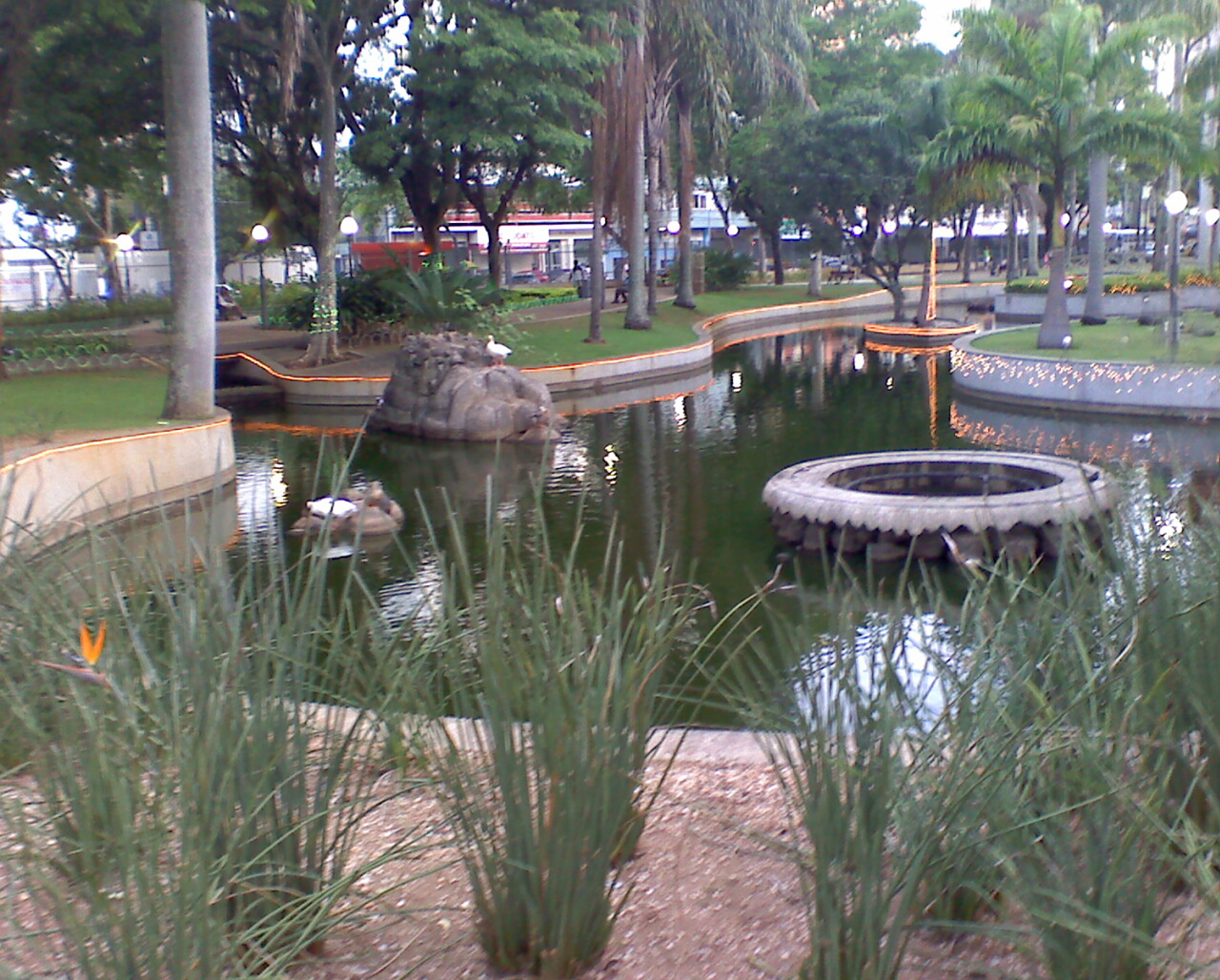
Moscoso Park with Christmas decoration in 2013.

Moscoso Park is a Brazilian protected area belonging to the national system of conservation units. Inaugurated in 1912, it is the oldest municipal park in the city of Vitória, in the state of Espírito Santo. With approximately 24 thousand square meters of area, it is considered an environment of tranquility amid the rush of the center of the metropolis. The name is a tribute to the president of the province Henrique Moscoso. It has a fish lake and two islands, crossed by bridges and boulevards formed by trees typical of the Atlantic Forest.

In the park there is the Acoustic Shell, a stage where countless shows take place, listed as cultural heritage by the State Council of Culture. In May 2012, 100 years were celebrated and for such commemoration the city of Vitória started works to restore the Acoustic Shell, overhaul of electrical installations, restoration of benches, walls and external sidewalks and renovation of the main lake.

== History ==
In the lower part of the island of Vitória there was an area known as Campinho (current Moscoso Park) formed by lands flooded by the tides of the bay of Vitória. The space was donated by the Federal Government through Federal Law to the then governor of the state Jerônimo Monteiro (1908-1912) for the construction of a park in honor of Henrique Moscoso. The area suffered several landfills and was later divided into lots. Landscape artist Paulo Motta Teixeira was in charge of carrying out the project and the works started in 1910.

Designed in the style of the 19th century, it was a large garden that gradually gained traces of eclectic and Art Nouveau style. Fountains, ruins of Greco-Latin temples, lagoons with small artificial islands and bridges were installed.

In the 1930s, the region of Parque Moscoso became highly valued, residences belonging to the capixaba elite settled in the vicinity. The area was open to the public, had a lot of vegetation, lakes, birds, a tennis court and was considered as the place for the encounter of capixaba society.

In 1952 the space undergoes a first intervention. Construction begins on the Acoustic Shell and the construction of the kindergarten, both designed by the architect Francisco Bolonha following the modern architecture of the 1950s, the boulevards were diverted and narrowed to make room for the Ecumenical Chapel, toys for children were implanted and walls and railings were built so that a system for charging admission was implemented, restricting their use, which ended up contradicting the definition and function of the Urban Park.

In 2001 the park underwent a new revitalization process to recover its original features. The wall was replaced by railings, the paths of the paths and the fountains returned to the original locations and small details were recovering original features, making it similar to what it was in the past.
